Aestuariibacter halophilus is a gram-negative, strictly aerobic, halophilic, catalase- and oxidase-positive, rod-shaped bacterium from the genus of motile Aestuariibacter with a single polar flagellum which was isolated from the Ganghwa island in Korea.

References

External links
Type strain of Aestuariibacter halophilus at BacDive -  the Bacterial Diversity Metadatabase

Alteromonadales
Bacteria described in 2004
Halophiles